The Eggental is a valley in South Tyrol, Italy.

References 

Alpenverein South Tyrol 

Valleys of South Tyrol